Ediélson Rocha Tenório (born 14 January 1967) is a Brazilian sprinter. He competed in the men's 400 metres at the 1992 Summer Olympics.

References

1967 births
Living people
Athletes (track and field) at the 1992 Summer Olympics
Brazilian male sprinters
Olympic athletes of Brazil
Place of birth missing (living people)
20th-century Brazilian people